The CT510 (previously known as the iSec (Sports Entertainment Center) and eBox) is a video game console created by eedoo Technology, a company created by Lenovo, with 40 Lenovo employees and investment of an undisclosed sum of money from the Lenovo Group, Legend Holdings and Legend Capital. It was first announced on August 30, 2010 to be marketed in China only upon its release, with further releases in the Asian-Pacific and worldwide markets planned if the console proves to be successful. The console was released in April 2012. To circumvent a ban on video game consoles, the system was advertised as a multimedia device.

Specifications
The eBox is a controller-less video game console, coming prepackaged with similar video tracking features as Microsoft's Kinect for the Xbox 360.

References

Lenovo
Home video game consoles
Eighth-generation video game consoles
Gesture recognition
Video gaming in China
Products introduced in 2012